The Both was an American indie rock musical duo consisting of Aimee Mann and Ted Leo. They began collaborating in 2013 and released a self-titled album in April 2014.

Origins

The songwriting collaboration between Aimee Mann and Ted Leo originated during a joint concert tour in 2012, and specifically with an appearance together at the Pabst Theater in Milwaukee, Wisconsin, on November 11, 2012, which was later described in the lyrics of their song "Milwaukee." At that time, Leo was the opening act for Mann, and the two sometimes collaborated on stage. They began writing songs together in December 2012.

Mann and Leo were initially brought to each other's attention in 2001, when Scott Miller, leader of the bands Game Theory and The Loud Family, gave Mann one of Leo's albums. Miller, who died in April 2013, was later described as having a "special, spiritual, guru-like presence" in the heart of The Both's debut album.

On March 8, 2013, the duo performed their first show together as #BOTH, formatting the band's name as a hashtag.

Personnel and performances
Mann and Leo frequently trade off lead vocal duties within their songs, each taking a verse before joining in harmonies that "expertly interw[ea]ve their voices."

Mann performs on bass and acoustic guitar, and Leo performs on electric guitar. In addition, during concerts Leo occasionally plays a modeling keyboard to replicate a few overdubs of strings and synthesized flute from the studio recordings that, according to Leo, "have become important parts of the songs" to him.

The Both have also become known for their extended on-stage "jokey banter", with "quips and asides" described as "nearly as great as the songs they fed into." Their concerts have been called "one part super-group show, and one part close friends... fluidly (and hilariously) play[ing] off of one another."

The Both typically perform with a guest drummer who is introduced and acknowledged, but who has no singing or speaking role onstage. Session drummer Scott Seiver toured with The Both in 2013 and played on the band's debut album. For the band's 2014 tour, Matt Mayhall replaced Seiver on drums, with Mann commenting in an interview, "We're a power trio."

The Both (2014)

 On April 15, 2014, The Both released their debut album, self-titled The Both, on Mann's label, SuperEgo Records.

Writing and production notes
Mann and Leo had initially announced in 2013 that they would be releasing an EP together, but after writing enough material for an EP, they decided to continue the collaboration and release a full LP.

The album's songs were written by a cross-country exchange of notes, taking "stems of an idea and kick[ing] them back and forth," according to Leo. As Mann described the songwriting process to Billboard, there were "some songs where each person has their verse, the chorus may be written by one person, the bridge written by the other, but there are definitely songs where we would go over line-by-line or just ask each other questions" to "focus the narrative."

The first co-written song, "You Can't Help Me Now," was started by Leo, who described himself as "shaken" when he received Mann's initial notes on the song, because "a person who I respect so much is handing me negative notes about something I wrote. It was really just my own quaking ego.... But we got past that pretty quickly." Leo described the partnership with Mann as "figuratively the best thing that has happened to my writing process in my life."

According to Mann, the song "Bedtime Stories" was written about Scott Miller, as an expression of mourning and as "a musical salute ... consciously a tribute to him, especially the chord progression of the chorus, which is very, very Loud Family."

The album was produced by Paul Bryan, a member of Mann's band, and was recorded in Los Angeles throughout 2013. Bryan also is credited as a performer on the album.

Music videos
During the week prior to the release of the album, SuperEgo Records released a music video of "Milwaukee," by director Daniel Ralston. The video featured Leo as both himself and his fictional uncle Ed Leo, supposedly a former drummer for A.O.D., providing a comical clash of styles while touring as drummer for The Both.

Later in 2014, the SuperEgo label released a music video for "Volunteers of America," also directed by Ralston, also featuring Ed Leo.

Track listing
All songs written by the Both, except "Honesty Is No Excuse" written by Phil Lynott.

The Barnes & Noble release of this album has two bonus tracks: acoustic versions of “Milwaukee” and “No Sir”.

Critical reception
The Both debuted on the Billboard 200 at #59, and on the Billboard Independent Albums chart at #12. Billboard called the album "a synthesis and meeting-in-the-middle of Leo and Mann's sonic signatures", resulting in a "warm, intimate and often exuberant piece of work."

The collaboration was well-received, with NPR's Stephen Thompson writing that "each singer sounds freshened and energized — never diminished." The A.V. Club wrote, "Even as Mann pushes toward friendly pop-rock and Leo pulls toward spiky punkiness, the lack of struggle in that mild tension makes for a charm offensive that's hard to resist." The Boston Globe cited "hand-in-glove harmonies" as the album's strongest point, with Mann's "mesmerizing, chalky murmur" giving a "warmly blurry edge" to Leo, while Leo's brashness helped "rough up her style."

Spin called the album "the best thing either artist has ever done," and a "pleasant late-career surprise from an auteur who needed more power and a rocker who needed more pop." In a previous article, Spin cited the song "Milwaukee" as both "brainy and leanly catchy, with a peppy chorus" and a "rollicking, raise-your-beers guitar solo."

Christmas releases
In 2014 and 2015, prior to tours together billed as "The Aimee Mann and Ted Leo Christmas Show," The Both released Christmas-themed songs as singles. "Nothing Left to Do (Let’s Make This Christmas Blue)," released in November 2014, was described by Stereogum as "a sweet song with some dark lyrics lamenting the feeling of listlessness that can come along with the holiday season." "You're a Gift," released in December 2015, conveyed a wistful theme of holiday anxiety and "longing for someone to hunker down with and enjoy the holiday spirit with."

Other collaborations
In 2019, Mann and Leo began a podcast through the Maximum Fun network, The Art of Process, in which they interview creative personalities on the process of turning ideas into art. Later that year, the two appeared on the animated television film Steven Universe: The Movie, with Mann reprising her role as Opal from the Steven Universe television series; they perform the song "Independent Together" with Pearl's voice actress Deedee Magno Hall.

References

External links
 
 

American alternative rock groups
American musical duos
American supergroups
Rock music supergroups
Male–female musical duos
Musical groups established in 2013
Aimee Mann
2013 establishments in the United States